M. R. Reghuchandrabal (born 12 March 1950) is an Indian politician belonging to Indian National Congress. He represented Kovalam and Parassala in the sixth and ninth Kerala Legislative Assembly respectively. He served as the minister of excise from 2 July 1991 to 16 March 1995 in the Fourth Karunakaran ministry. He has also served as the president of Kanjiramkulam Panchayat.

References

1950 births
Kerala MLAs 1991–1996
Malayali politicians
Indian National Congress politicians from Kerala
Living people